Incontrovertible evidence, or conclusive evidence, is a colloquial term for evidence introduced to prove a fact that is supposed to be so conclusive that there can be no other truth to the matter; evidence so strong it overpowers contrary evidence, directing a fact-finder to a specific and certain conclusion.

A "conclusive evidence" clause may be included in a contract or deed of guarantee, having the effect of showing that, in the absence of manifest error, the guarantor is liable to deliver on their guarantee when their obligation is triggered: the Commercial Court in England and Wales ruled on the effect of such a clause in the case of Carey Value Added S.L. v Grupo Urvasco SA in 2010. Conclusive evidence clauses are interpreted strictly by the courts, with any ambiguity being resolved in favour of the guarantor.

References

Evidence law